Hecate Island is an island on the British Columbia Coast, Canada, located between Queen Charlotte Sound and Fitz Hugh Sound to the north of Calvert Island.

References

Islands of British Columbia
North Coast of British Columbia